The Wolfhounds are an English noise pop band formed in Romford, Essex, in 1985 by Dave Callahan, Paul Clark, Andy Golding, Andy Bolton and Frank Stebbing, and originally active until 1990. The band reformed in 2005 and continues to write, record and play live, releasing new albums in 2014, 2016, and 2020.

History
The Wolfhounds began as a slightly askew indiepop/rock band, and signed to the Pink label in 1986. First EP Cut the Cake was well enough received for the NME to include them on their C86 compilation album. After three singles and debut album Unseen Ripples From A Pebble on Pink, they briefly moved to Idea Records for the Me single, then rejoined Pink's boss at his new label September Records. September soon evolved into Midnight Music which was the Wolfhounds' home for all subsequent releases.

With original members Bolton and Clark replaced by David Oliver and Matt Deighton, the Wolfhounds' sound developed into a denser, less poppy sound. After a compilation of earlier material, second album proper Bright and Guilty was released in 1989, featuring the singles "Son of Nothing", "Rent Act" and "Happy Shopper".  The sound progressed further with the albums Blown Away (also 1989) and Attitude (1990), which found them in Sonic Youth territory, interspersing raging guitars with elegant compositional exercises. This proved to be the final Wolfhounds release of the 80s, with the band splitting in early 1990.

Golding and Stebbing formed Crawl, while Callahan hooked up with former Ultra Vivid Scene member Margaret Fiedler in Moonshake. Matt Deighton formed Mother Earth.

Reformation
The current line-up is David Callahan (guitar/vocals), Andy Golding (guitar/vocals), Peter Wilkins (drums) and Richard Golding (bass). The Wolfhounds reformed in 2005 for a gig to mark the 20th anniversary of the release of their first single "Cut the Cake" in 1985.

In 2006, they were asked by Bob Stanley of Saint Etienne to play at the ICA in London, alongside Roddy Frame and Phil Wilson, to celebrate the 20th Anniversary of the NME cassette C86. They have continued to play live, re-energised when The Membranes asked them to be special guests at The Lexington in London, and in March 2012 played with Laetitia Sadier from Stereolab in support at a benefit to raise funds for the Timperley Frank Sidebottom memorial statue.
 
An EP called EP001 was released on Vollwert-Records Berlin in April 2012 containing three songs that pre-date the band's first single but that were never recorded satisfactorily at the time. Of these songs, 'Skullface' has picked up a lot of radio play.

The band released several 7" singles in 2013, compiled with the previous EP on Middle Age Freaks, released by Odd Box Records in 2014. Also in 2014 an anniversary limited-edition issue of Unseen Ripples from a Pebble (plus bonus tracks) was released by Optic Nerve Recordings.

In October 2016, the Wolfhounds released their fifth album proper, Untied Kingdom (...Or How to Come to Terms with Your Culture). Louder Than War rated it 9/10. Sixth album Electric Music followed in 2020, which the same magazine declared was "arguably their best" so far.

Solo
Callahan, as David Lance Callahan, released a solo single "Strange Lovers" in 2019, followed by the album English Primitive I in 2021. Andy Golding, as Dragon Welding, released an eponymous LP in 2019, and second album Lights Behind The Eyes in 2021.

Discography
Chart placings shown are from the UK Indie Chart.

Albums
Unseen Ripples from a Pebble (#6) (May 1987, Pink, PINKY19 [LP]; Nov 2014, Optic Nerve, OPT4.012 [LP & CD])
Bright and Guilty (February 1989, Midnight Music, CHIME048 [LP]/CHIME048C [C]/CHIME048CD [CD]; Aug 2022, Optic Nerve [2LP] - reissue w/extra tracks)
Blown Away (October 1989, Midnight Music, CHIME057F [LP]/CHIME057C [C]/CHIME057CD [CD])
Attitude (May 1990, Midnight Music, CHIME1.07 [LP]/CHIME1.07CC [C]/CHIME1.07CD [CD])
Untied Kingdom (…Or How to Come to Terms with Your Culture) (October 2016, Oddbox, [LP]; 2017, Optic Nerve [CD])
Electric Music (2020, A Turntable Friend [LP/CD])

Live albums
My Life as a Young Idiot (Hammersmith 1985) (DL, 2015)
Blazing White Bleached Crack in the Top (Brixton 1986) (DL, 2015)
Noise-pop aus UK (Netherlands 1987) (DL, 2015)
I Miss the Electric Mistress (Brighton 1989) (DL, 2015)

Compilations
The Essential Wolfhounds (November 1988, Midnight Music, CHIME0032S [LP]/COLIN1CD [CD])
Lost But Happy (1986-1990) (April 1996, Cherry Red, CDMRED126 [CD])
Middle Aged Freaks (November 2014, Oddbox, BOX023 [CD])
Hands in the Till: The Complete John Peel Sessions (2018, A Turntable Friend, LP/CD)

Singles/EPs
"Cut the Cake" (March 1986, Pink, PINKY8 [12"]) (#19)
"The Anti-Midas Touch" (September 1986, Pink, PINKY14 [7"]/PINKY14T [12"]) (#6)
"Rats on a Raft"/(b/w Razorcuts track) (1986, The Legend!, Leg100 [7" flexi])
"Cruelty" (April 1987, Pink, PINKY18 [7"]/PINKY18T [12"]) (#15)
"Me" (November 1987, Idea, IDEA10 [7"]/ISEACI10 [CS]/IDEAT10 [12"]) (#18)
"Son of Nothing" (May 1988, September, SEPT07T [12"])
"Rent Act" (November 1988, Midnight Music, DONG043 [12"])
"Happy Shopper" (March 1989, Midnight Music, DING046 [7"]/DONG046 [12"])
EP001 ["Skullface"/"Rats on a Raft"/"6000 Acres"] (April 2012, Vollwert-Records, Berlin, EP001 [CD])
"Cheer Up"/"Security"/"The Devil Looks After Her Own" (January 2013, Odd Box, ODD038 [7"])
"Cheer Up"/"Skullface" (May 2013, Manic Pop!, manicpop020 [7"])
"Divide and Fall"/"The Ten Commandments of Public Life" (2013, Oddbox, ODD055 [7"])
"Anthem"/"Middle-Aged Freak" (2013, Oddbox, ODD056 [7"])

References

External links

Bandcamp
Wolfhounds Peel Sessions
2016 Songwriting Magazine interview
2016 Echoes and Dust interview
2020 interview

English indie rock groups
Noise pop musical groups
Musical groups established in 1985
Musical groups disestablished in 1990
Musical groups reestablished in 2005
1985 establishments in England